Kadenicarpus horripilus is a species of plant in the family Cactaceae.

It is endemic to Hidalgo state in Mexico.  Its natural habitat is hot deserts.

It is an endangered species, threatened by habitat loss.

Description
Kadenicarpus horripilus often grows sprouting with olive-green, spherical to elongated spherical bodies and fibrous roots. The bodies reach growth heights of 7 to 18 centimeters and a diameter of 4 to 6.5 centimeters. Their clearly pronounced conical cusps are 5 to 7 millimeters high. The plant usually a single, protruding, straight, whitish central spine that is dark at the tip. It reaches a length of 12 to 18 millimeters. The 12 to 14 straight radial spines are white with a dark tip, protruding and 9 to 11 millimeters long.

The flowers are magenta with a white throat. They are 2.2 to 3.1 centimeters long and have a diameter of 2.5 to 3.5 centimeters. The elongated, greenish-red fruits turn yellowish-brownish when ripe. They are 4 to 6 millimeters long and reach a diameter of 3 to 5 millimeters

References

External links
 
 
 

Cactoideae
Cacti of Mexico
Endemic flora of Mexico
Flora of Hidalgo (state)
Endangered plants
Endangered biota of Mexico
Taxonomy articles created by Polbot